Didube is a metro station in Tbilisi, Georgia. It is located on the Akhmeteli–Varketili Line. Didube is three stations from the central station, and five from the city's main street (Rustaveli Avenue metro station, Tbilisi Rustaveli Avenue), in between Gotsiridze and Grmagele stations. The station is above ground.

The Didube markets are located nearby, and the city's main bus station lies adjacent to the metro station. As buses to a number of locations, such as Vladikavkaz and the ski-fields at Bakuriani depart from there, it is common for people to catch the metro to Didube, and then change to the buses. 
A heavy rail train station adjacent to the metro station used to serve passengers during the times of the Soviet Union and was prepared to be one of the central stations when the Tbilisi Bypass Railway project in action. Since the abandonment of the Tbilisi Bypass Railway project, the heavy rail platform at Didube sits dorment.

If the planned third line for the Tbilisi Metro goes ahead, it will interlink with the Akhmeteli–Varketili Line at this station.

On 9 October 1997, a former policeman blew himself up with a homemade bomb at the station. No one else was injured.

See also
 List of Tbilisi metro stations

External links
 Didube station page at Tbilisi Municipal Portal

Tbilisi Metro stations
Railway stations opened in 1966
1966 establishments in Georgia (country)